Flight Lieutenant Alfred Tyrone Cooke VrC (born 1939 or 1940) is an Indian pilot who was decorated for his role in the Indo-Pakistani War of 1965. He was honoured with the Vir Chakra in September 1965. He received the award for shooting down a Sabre jet and severely damaging another, whilst flying a Hawker Hunter, whilst they were under anti-aircraft fire. 
It has been said that, "Flt Lt Alfred Tyrone Cooke is the only pilot in the Indian Air Force, who could claim to have engaged multiple enemy aircraft in the air and got the better of them."

Biography
Alfred Cooke VrC attended La Martiniere Lucknow. He left service as a Flight Lieutenant and settled down in Australia.

He is married and has two sons.

Vir Chakra
The citation for the Vir Chakra awarded to him reads:

See also
 Aerial warfare in 1965 India Pakistan War
 History of the Indian Air Force

References

External links
"A 1965 Vir Chakra fighter pilot returns home from Australia"

Living people
Date of birth missing (living people)
Indian Air Force officers
Indian aviators
Pilots of the Indo-Pakistani War of 1965
La Martinière College, Lucknow alumni
Recipients of the Vir Chakra
Indian emigrants to Australia
Year of birth uncertain
1940 births